The High Road is a comedy play by the British writer Frederick Lonsdale which was first staged in 1927. It opened in the  West End at the Shaftesbury Theatre, and ran for 234 performances. The following year, it opened on Broadway at the Fulton Theatre, where ran for 144 performances,  with Alfred Drayton and Frederick Kerr from the London cast.

In 1930 it was adapted into the American film The Lady of Scandal directed by Sidney Franklin and starring Ruth Chatterton and Basil Rathbone.

Original London cast
Ernest - Brian Gilmour
Lord Trench - Fred Kerr
Sir Reginald Whelby - Miles Clifton
Lord Crayle - Allan Aynesworth
Morton - Claude Disney-Roebuck
Duke of Warrington - Ian Hunter
Lord Teylesmore - Colin Keith-Johnston
James Hilary - Alfred Drayton
Alex - Marjorie Brooks
Lady Minister - Mary Jerrold
Lady Trench - Gertrude Kingston
Elsie Hilary - Cecily Byrne

References

Bibliography
 Donaldson, Frances. Freddy Lonsdale. Bloomsbury Publishing,  2011.
 Nicoll, Alardyce. English Drama, 1900-1930: The Beginnings of the Modern Period. Part I. Cambridge University Press, 1973.

External links
 

Plays by Frederick Lonsdale
1927 plays
British plays adapted into films
Plays set in London
West End plays